The sixth and final season of the American television series This Is Us continues to follow the lives and connections of the Pearson family across several time periods. The season is produced by Rhode Island Ave. Productions, Zaftig Films, and 20th Television, with Dan Fogelman, Isaac Aptaker, and Elizabeth Berger serving as showrunners.

The series was renewed for a fourth, fifth, and sixth season in May 2019. The season stars an ensemble cast featuring Milo Ventimiglia, Mandy Moore, Sterling K. Brown, Chrissy Metz, Justin Hartley, Susan Kelechi Watson, Chris Sullivan, Jon Huertas, Caitlin Thompson, Chris Geere, Niles Fitch, Logan Shroyer, Hannah Zeile, Eris Baker, Faithe Herman, Lyric Ross, Asante Blackk, and Griffin Dunne. On May 12, 2021, it was announced that the sixth season would be the series' last.

The sixth season premiered on January 4, 2022 and concluded on May 24, 2022. The season consisted of 18 episodes.

Cast and characters

Main 

 Milo Ventimiglia as Jack Pearson
 Mandy Moore as Rebecca Pearson
 Sterling K. Brown as Randall Pearson
 Niles Fitch as teenage Randall Pearson
 Chrissy Metz as Kate Pearson
 Hannah Zeile as teenage Kate Pearson
 Justin Hartley as Kevin Pearson
 Logan Shroyer as teenage Kevin Pearson
 Susan Kelechi Watson as Beth Pearson
 Chris Sullivan as Toby Damon
 Jon Huertas as Miguel Rivas
 Caitlin Thompson as Madison Simons
 Chris Geere as Phillip
 Eris Baker as Tess Pearson
 Faithe Herman as Annie Pearson
 Lyric Ross as Deja Pearson
 Asante Blackk as Malik Hodges
 Griffin Dunne as Nicky Pearson

Recurring
 Jennifer Morrison as Cassidy Sharp
 Blake Stadnik as Jack Damon
 Auden Thornton as Lucy
 Alexandra Breckenridge as Sophie
 Amanda Leighton as teenage Sophie 
 Mike Manning as 'The Manny'

Guest
 Ron Cephas Jones as William Hill 
 Andrew Santino as Casey
 Vanessa Bell Calloway as Edie
 Tyler Barnhardt as Mike
 Katie Lowes as Arielle

Episodes

Production 

On May 12, 2019, NBC renewed the series for its fourth, fifth and sixth seasons, at 18 episodes each, for a total of 54 additional episodes. The season was confirmed to be the final season in May 2021.  The sixth season featured the directorial debuts of actors Chris Sullivan and Mandy Moore. Cast member Susan Kelechi Watson co-wrote the episode "Our Little Island Girl: Part Two", which focused on her character, Beth.  Watson felt that she was writing the end of Beth's emotional arc, and that it was "beautiful" to have that opportunity.

Reception

Note: Live+3 day ratings have been stated where Live+7 day ratings are unavailable.

References

External links

Official finale screenplay

2022 American television seasons
This Is Us
Television shows about the COVID-19 pandemic